Mikko K.J. Kaasalainen (1965 – 12 April 2020) was a Finnish applied mathematician and mathematical physicist. He was professor of mathematics at the department of mathematics at Tampere University of Technology. Kaasalainen mostly worked on inverse problems and their applications especially in astrophysics, as well as on dynamical systems.

Education and career

Kaasalainen received an MSc in theoretical physics at the University of Helsinki in 1990, moving shortly afterwards to Merton College, Oxford where he completed his DPhil in theoretical physics in 1994, supervised by James Binney. After a series of post-doctoral and senior positions in Europe, he moved to the University of Helsinki and to his present institute in 2009. He led a research group in the Finnish Centre of Excellence in Inverse Problems Research.

Kaasalainen was awarded the first Pertti Lindfors prize of the Finnish Inverse Problems Society in 2001. The asteroid 16007 Kaasalainen, discovered by ODAS in 1999, was named in his honour. The official  was published by the Minor Planet Center on 7 January 2004.

Research

Kaasalainen's research interests mostly focused on mathematical modelling in various fields ranging from remote sensing and space research to planetary and galactic dynamics. Typically, the models and mathematical methods Kaasalainen developed with his colleagues are connected with inverse problems. Two such topics featured prominently in Kaasalainen's research:

 Asteroid lightcurve inversion, i.e., the reconstruction of the shapes and spin states of asteroids from their brightness measurements (lightcurves), based on mathematical results and uniqueness and stability theorems that have been transformed into modelling algorithms with which a multitude of otherwise unresolvable asteroids can now be mapped. This method has also been used in the direct verification of the Yarkovsky–O'Keefe–Radzievskii–Paddack effect in our solar system.
 Analysis of large dynamical systems, where torus construction methods in phase space allow a compact representation or approximation of the dynamics of the observed system (such as a galaxy).

References

External links
 Mikko Kaasalainen's homepage at the University of Helsinki 
 Asteroid model website at the Charles University in Prague
 Finnish Centre of Excellence in Inverse Problems Research

1965 births
2020 deaths
Alumni of Merton College, Oxford
20th-century Finnish mathematicians
21st-century Finnish  mathematicians